Mount Villard is in the Beartooth Mountains in the U.S. state of Montana. The peak is one of the tallest in the Beartooth Mountains and is in the Absaroka-Beartooth Wilderness on the border of Custer and Gallatin National Forests. Hidden Glacier lies to the northwest of the peak.

References

Villard
Beartooth Mountains